Carabus exiguus cithara is a black coloured subspecies of ground beetle in the subfamily Carabinae that is endemic to Sichuan, China.

References

exiguus cithara
Beetles described in 2002
Beetles of Asia
Endemic fauna of Sichuan